James L. Bowdoin (January 15, 1904 – May 11, 1969) was an American football guard for seven years primarily with the Green Bay Packers of the National Football League (NFL). He played college football for Alabama where he won two national championships. He also had professional stints with the New York Giants, Portsmouth Spartans, and two separate seasons with the Brooklyn Dodgers.

References

1904 births
1969 deaths
People from Geneva County, Alabama
American football offensive guards
Green Bay Packers players
Brooklyn Dodgers (NFL) players
New York Giants players
Providence Steam Roller players
Alabama Crimson Tide football players
All-Southern college football players